Le toréador, ou L'accord parfait (The Toreador, or The Perfect Agreement)  is an opéra comique in two acts by the French composer Adolphe Adam with a libretto by Thomas-Marie-François Sauvage. It was first performed at the Opéra-Comique, Paris on 18 May 1849. It was a huge success and the work regularly appeared in the repertoire of the Opéra-Comique until 1869. Adam made use of several familiar pieces of music in the score. The most famous number is a series of variations on "Ah! vous dirai-je, maman" (better known as the melody of "Twinkle, twinkle, little star" in the English-speaking world). The opera also quotes the aria "Tandis que tout sommeille" from Grétry's L'amant jaloux and "Je brûlerai d'une flamme éternelle" from the same composer's Le tableau parlant as well as popular folk tunes, including the Spanish fandango, cachucha and follia. In spite of this, there is little attempt to give the score local colour. The opera was originally intended to be a single act but was split in two to allow the soprano time to recover her breath in a taxing role.

Roles

Synopsis
Place: The garden of Don Belflor's house in Barcelona

Act One
Coraline, a former opera singer from Paris, is unhappily married to the retired bullfighter Don Belflor. She remembers how a flute-player, Tracolin, was in love with her. At this point, Tracolin himself appears in Barcelona, intent on renewing his acquaintance with Coraline. The two exchange love letters over the garden wall. Tracolin saves Don Belfor from an attack by ruffians and is invited into his house. He claims he is acting as a go-between for a dancer at the opera, Caritéa, who has fallen in love with Don Belflor. The old man is flattered but asks for further proof and Tracolin can think of no other recourse but to give him Coraline's letter. As Don Belflor is leaving for liaison with Caritéa, Coraline accuses him of adultery. In his confusion Don Belflor drops the letter on the floor. The horrified Coraline believes that she has been found out.

Act Two
Coraline cannot understand why Don Belfor has not reacted angrily to the contents of the letter. Tracolin climbs over the garden wall and tells her he has been in love with her since they met at the opera. He reveals the details of her husband's adultery then leaves the garden. When Don Belflor returns, Coraline again accuses him of infidelity. He admits the truth when she mentions the name "Caritéa" and begs for her forgiveness. She accepts so long as she is allowed to keep Tracolin in the house as her lover. Don Belflor, who does not want to lose the generous dowry the marriage brought him, agrees.

Recordings
Le toreador Sumi Jo, John Aler, Michel Trempont, Orchestra of the Welsh National Opera, conducted by Richard Bonynge (Decca, recorded 1996, Swansea)

Sources

Booklet notes to the above recording.

Operas by Adolphe Adam
French-language operas
Opéras comiques
1849 operas
Operas
Opera world premieres at the Opéra-Comique